The mere addition paradox (also known as the repugnant conclusion) is a problem in ethics identified by Derek Parfit and discussed in his book Reasons and Persons (1984). The paradox identifies the mutual incompatibility of four intuitively compelling assertions about the relative value of populations. Parfit’s original formulation of the repugnant conclusion is that “For any perfectly equal population with very high positive welfare, there is a population with very low positive welfare which is better, other things being equal.”

The paradox

Consider the four populations depicted in the following diagram: A, A+, B− and B. Each bar represents a distinct group of people. The bar's width represents group size while the bar's height represents group happiness. Unlike A and B, A+ and B− are complex populations, each comprising two distinct groups of people. It is also stipulated that the lives of the members of each group are good enough that they should be alive than for them to not exist.

How do these populations compare in value? Parfit makes the following three suggestions: 

1. A+ seems no worse than A. This is because the people in A are no worse-off in A+, while the additional people who exist in A+ are better off in A+ compared to A, since it is stipulated that their lives are good enough that it is better for them to be alive than to not exist.

2. B− seems better than A+. This is because B− has greater total and average happiness than A+.

3. B seems equally as good as B−, as the only difference between B− and B is that the two groups in B− are merged to form one group in B.

Together, these three comparisons entail that B is better than A. However, Parfit also observes the following: 

4. When we directly compare A (a population with high average happiness) and B (a population with lower average happiness, but more total happiness because of its larger population), it may seem that B can be worse than A.

Thus, there is a paradox. The following intuitively plausible claims are jointly incompatible: (1) that A+ is no worse than A, (2) that B− is better than A+, (3) that B− is as good as B, and (4) that B can be worse than A.

Criticisms and responses
Some scholars, such as Larry Temkin and Stuart Rachels, argue that inconsistencies between the four claims (above) relies on the assumption that the "better than" relation is transitive. We may resolve the inconsistency, thus, by rejecting the assumption. On this view, from the fact that A+ is no worse than A and that B− is better than A+ it simply does not follow that B− is better than A.

Torbjörn Tännsjö argues that the intuition that B is worse than A is wrong. While the lives of those in B are worse than those in A, there are more of them and thus the collective value of B is greater than A. Michael Huemer also argues that the repugnant conclusion is not repugnant and that normal intuition is wrong.

However, Parfit argues that the above discussion fails to appreciate the true source of repugnance. He claims that on the face of it, it may not be absurd to think that B is better than A. Suppose, then, that B is in fact better than A, as Huemer argues. It follows that this revised intuition must hold in subsequent iterations of the original steps. For example, the next iteration would add even more people to B+, and then take the average of the total happiness, resulting in C−. If these steps are repeated over and over, the eventual result will be Z, a massive population with the minimum level of average happiness; this would be a population in which every member is leading a life barely worth living. Parfit claims that it is Z that is the repugnant conclusion.

Alternative usage
An alternative use of the term mere addition paradox was presented in a paper by Hassoun in 2010. It identifies paradoxical reasoning that occurs when certain statistical measures are used to calculate results over a population. For example, if a group of 100 people together control $100 worth of resources, the average wealth per capita is $1. If a single rich person then arrives with 1 million dollars, then the total group of 101 people controls $1,000,100, making average wealth per capita $9,901, implying a drastic shift away from poverty even though nothing has changed for the original 100 people. Hassoun defines a no mere addition axiom to be used for judging such statistical measures: "merely adding a rich person to a population should not decrease poverty" (although acknowledging that in actual practice adding rich people to a population may provide some benefit to the whole population).

This same argument can be generalized to many cases where proportional statistics are used: for example, a video game sold on a download service may be considered a failure if less than 20% of those who download the game demo then purchase the game. Thus, if 10,000 people download the demo of a game and 2,000 buy it, the game is a borderline success; however, it would be rendered a failure by an extra 500 people downloading the demo and not buying, even though this "mere addition" changes nothing with regard to income or consumer satisfaction from the previous situation.

See also
A Theory of Justice
Asymmetry (population ethics)
Average and total utilitarianism
Carrying capacity
Ecological footprint
Nonidentity problem
Human overpopulation
Person-affecting view
Sorites paradox
Utility monster
Industrial Revolution

Notes

References
 Parfit, Derek. Reasons and Persons, ch. 17 and 19. Oxford University Press 1986.
 Ryberg, Jesper & Tännsjö, Torbjorn (eds.). The Repugnant Conclusion. Essays on Population Ethics. Dordrecht: Kluwer Academic Publishers, 2004 .
 Temkin, Larry. "Intransitivity and the Mere Addition Paradox", Philosophy and Public Affairs. 16 (2) (Spring 1987): 138–187
 Tännsjö, Torbjörn. Hedonistic Utilitarianism. Edinburgh University Press 1998.
 Hassoun, Nicole. Another Mere Addition Paradox, UNU-WIDER Working Paper 2010, .

External links
 The Repugnant Conclusion (Stanford Encyclopedia of Philosophy)
 Contestabile, Bruno. On the Buddhist Truths and the Paradoxes in Population Ethics, Contemporary Buddhism, Vol. 11 Issue 1, pp. 103–113, Routledge 2010

Population ethics
Thought experiments in ethics
Philosophical paradoxes
Utilitarianism
1984 introductions